Norms are concepts (sentences) of practical import, oriented to affecting an action, rather than conceptual abstractions that describe, explain, and express. Normative sentences imply "ought-to" types of statements and assertions, in distinction to sentences that provide "is" types of statements and assertions. Common normative sentences include commands, permissions, and prohibitions; common normative abstract concepts include sincerity, justification, and  honesty. A popular account of norms describes them as reasons to take action, to believe, and to feel.

Types of norms
Orders and permissions express norms. Such norm sentences do not describe how the world is, they rather prescribe how the world should be. Imperative sentences are the most obvious way to express norms, but declarative sentences also may be norms, as is the case with laws or 'principles'. Generally, whether an expression is a norm depends on what the sentence intends to assert. For instance, a sentence of the form "All Ravens are Black" could on one account be taken as descriptive, in which case an instance of a white raven would contradict it, or alternatively "All Ravens are Black" could be interpreted as a norm, in which case it stands as a principle and definition, so 'a white raven' would then not be a raven.

Those norms purporting to create obligations (or duties) and permissions are called deontic norms (see also deontic logic). The concept of deontic norm is already an extension of a previous concept of norm, which would only include imperatives, that is, norms purporting to create duties. The understanding that permissions are norms in the same way was an important step in ethics and philosophy of law.

In addition to deontic norms, many other varieties have been identified. For instance, some constitutions establish the national anthem. These norms do not directly create any duty or permission. They create a "national symbol". Other norms create nations themselves or political and administrative regions within a nation. The action orientation of such norms is less obvious than in the case of a command or permission, but is essential for understanding the relevance of issuing such norms: When a folk song becomes a "national anthem" the meaning of singing one and the same song changes; likewise, when a piece of land becomes an administrative region, this has legal consequences for many activities taking place on that territory; and without these consequences concerning action, the norms would be irrelevant. A more obviously action-oriented variety of such constitutive norms (as opposed to deontic or regulatory norms) establishes social institutions which give rise to new, previously inexistent types of actions or activities (a standard example is the institution of marriage without which "getting married" would not be a feasible action; another is the rules constituting a game: without the norms of soccer, there would not exist such an action as executing an indirect free kick).

Any convention can create a norm, although the relation between both is not settled.

There is a significant discussion about (legal) norms that give someone the power to create other norms. They are called power-conferring norms or norms of competence. Some authors argue that they are still deontic norms, while others argue for a close connection between them and institutional facts (see Raz 1975, Ruiter 1993).

Linguistic conventions, for example, the convention in English that "cat" means cat or the convention in Portuguese that "gato" means cat, are among the most important norms.

Games completely depend on norms. The fundamental norm of many games is the norm establishing who wins and loses. In other games, it is the norm establishing how to score points.

Major characteristics
One major characteristic of norms is that, unlike propositions, they are not descriptively true or false, since norms do not purport to describe anything, but to prescribe, create or change something.  Deontologists would denote them to be "prescriptively true" or false.  Whereas the truth of a descriptive statement is purportedly based on its correspondence to reality, some philosophers, beginning with Aristotle, assert that the (prescriptive) truth of a prescriptive statement is based on its correspondence to right desire.  Other philosophers maintain that norms are ultimately neither true or false, but only successful or unsuccessful (valid or invalid), as their propositional content obtains or not (see also John Searle and speech act).

There is an important difference between norms and normative propositions, although they are often expressed by identical sentences.  "You may go out" usually expresses a norm if it is uttered by the teacher to one of the students, but it usually expresses a normative proposition if it is uttered to one of the students by one of his or her classmates.  Some ethical theories reject that there can be normative propositions, but these are accepted by cognitivism.  One can also think of propositional norms; assertions and questions arguably express propositional norms (they set a proposition as asserted or questioned).

Another purported feature of norms, it is often argued, is that they never regard only natural properties or entities.  Norms always bring something artificial, conventional, institutional or "unworldly".  This might be related to Hume's assertion that it is not possible to derive ought from is and to G.E. Moore's claim that there is a naturalistic fallacy when one tries to analyse "good" and "bad" in terms of a natural concept.  In aesthetics, it has also been argued that it is impossible to derive an aesthetical predicate from a non-aesthetical one. The acceptability of non-natural properties, however, is strongly debated in present-day philosophy. Some authors deny their existence, some others try to reduce them to natural ones, on which the former supervene.

Other thinkers (Adler, 1986) assert that norms can be natural in a different sense than that of "corresponding to something proceeding from the object of the prescription as a strictly internal source of action".  Rather, those who assert the existence of natural prescriptions say norms can suit a natural need on the part of the prescribed entity.  More to the point, however, is the putting forward of the notion that just as descriptive statements being considered true are conditioned upon certain self-evident descriptive truths suiting the nature of reality (such as:  it is impossible for the same thing to be and not be at the same time and in the same manner), a prescriptive truth can suit the nature of the will through the authority of it being based upon self-evident prescriptive truths (such as:  one ought to desire what is really good for one and nothing else).

Recent works maintain that normativity has an important role in several different philosophical subjects, not only in ethics and philosophy of law (see Dancy, 2000).

See also

 Constitution
 Deontic logic
 Deontology
 Law (principle)
 Meta-ethics
 Norm (sociology)
 Normative
 Normative ethics
 Normative statement
 Philosophy of law
 Principle
 Law
 Rule of law
 Rule according to higher law
 Social norm
 Speech act

Further reading
 Adler, Mortimer (1985), Ten Philosophical Mistakes, MacMillan, New York.
 Aglo, John (1998), Norme et symbole:  les fondements philosophiques de l'obligation, L'Harmattan, Paris.
 Aglo, John (2001), Les fondements philosophiques de la morale dans une société à tradition orale, L'Harmattan, Paris.
 Alexy, Robert (1985), Theorie der Grundrechte, Suhrkamp, Frankfurt a. M.. Translation: A Theory of Constitutional Rights, Oxford University Press, Oxford: 2002.
 Bicchieri, Cristina (2006), The Grammar of Society: the Nature and Dynamics of Social Norms, Cambridge University Press, Cambridge.
 Dancy, Jonathan (ed) (2000), Normativity, Blackwell, Oxford.
 Garzón Valdés, Ernesto et al. (eds) (1997), Normative Systems in Legal and Moral Theory: Festschrift for Carlos E. Alchourrón and Eugenio Bulygin, Duncker & Humblot, Berlin.
 Korsgaard, Christine (2000), The Sources of Normativity, Cambridge University, Cambridge.
 Raz, Joseph (1975, 1990), Practical Reason and Norms, Oxford University Press, Oxford;  2nd edn 1990.
 Rosen, Bernard (1999), The Centrality of Normative Ethical Theory, Peter Lang, New York.
 Ruiter, Dick (1993), Institutional Legal Facts: Legal Powers and their Effects, Kluwer, Dordrecht.
 Turri, John (2016), Knowledge and the Norm of Assertion: An Essay in Philosophical Science, Open Book Publishers, Cambridge.
 von Wright, G. H. (1963), Norm and Action:  a Logical Enquiry, Routledge & Kegan Paul, London.

Concepts in ethics
Consensus reality
Philosophy of language
Philosophy of law
Social concepts